Dowqarun (also Romanized as Dowqārūn, Dūghārūn, Do Ghārūn, and Doqārūn; also known as Dehqārown and Doghāravan) is a village in Pain Velayat Rural District, in the Central District of Taybad County, Razavi Khorasan Province, Iran. At the 2006 census, its population was 80, in 16 families.

References 

Populated places in Taybad County